Carolyn J. Dean is Charles J. Stille Professor of History and French at Yale University. She was John Hay Professor of International Studies at Brown University until moving to Yale in 2013.

Dean studied history at the University of California, Berkeley for college and graduate school. She taught there and at Northwestern University before joining Brown in 1991. She moved to Yale in 2013 and in 2016 was promoted to Charles J. Stille Professor.

In 1997, Dean won a Guggenheim Fellowship.

Works

References

Yale University faculty
Brown University faculty
University of California, Berkeley alumni
Historians of France
Historians of genocides
Year of birth missing (living people)
Living people